Mohammadabad-e Barkhvordar (also Romanized as Moḩammadābād-e Barkhvordār and Moḩammadābād Barkhowrdār; also known as Moḩammadābād-e Harātī) is a village in Bahreman Rural District, Nuq District, Rafsanjan County, Kerman Province, Iran. At the 2006 census, its population was 124, in 32 families.

References 

Populated places in Rafsanjan County